The Sentinel Butte Public School on Byron St. in Sentinel Butte, North Dakota, United States, also known as Sentinel Butte High School, was built in 1907.  It was listed on the National Register of Historic Places in 1982, for its architecture.  It was designed by Fargo architects Haxby & Gillespie.

References

School buildings completed in 1907
School buildings on the National Register of Historic Places in North Dakota
National Register of Historic Places in Golden Valley County, North Dakota
1907 establishments in North Dakota
Demolished buildings and structures in North Dakota